Tang Shi (born 24 January 1995) is a Chinese footballer who currently plays as a left winger for Guangzhou Evergrande.

Club career
Tang Shi started his football career with Wuhan Optics Valley and joined Shandong Luneng's youth academy in 2009 after Wuhan's disbandment. He refused to sign a professional contract with Shandong and transferred to Série A side Botafogo's youth academy in May 2014. He was then given a trial with Real Madrid Castilla thanks to a youth training partnership between the two clubs; however, he remained at Botafogo's youth academy after the trial.
     
On 29 July 2015, Tang transferred to Campeonato de Portugal side Gondomar. He made his debut for the club on 23 August 2015 in a 3–0 win against Vila Real. He made thirty appearances and scored twelve goals for the club in the 2015-16 season. On 1 July 2016, Tang was loaned to Primeira Liga side Paços de Ferreira after signing with China League One side Meizhou Hakka. He made his debut for the club on 25 October 2016 in a 4–0 win against C.D. Nacional in the 2016-17 Taça da Liga.

After playing just two cup matches for Paços de Ferreira, Tang terminated his contract and was loaned to Chinese Super League side Beijing Guoan for one season in February 2017. On 5 March 2017, he made his debut for the club in the first match of the season in a 2–1 away loss against Guangzhou Evergrande. He was a regular starter at the beginning of season as the benefactor of the new rule of the league that at least one Under-23 player must be in the starting line-up. However, his playing time was on the decline during the season, and he eventually lost his position to Ba Dun after manager José González was sacked by the club in June 2017. Tang played 14 league matches for the club in the 2017 season.

On 24 December 2017, Tang transferred to top tier side Guangzhou Evergrande. He made his debut on 18 March 2018 in a 1–0 home win over Henan Jianye, coming on for Yu Hanchao in the 79th minute. He scored his first goal for the club on 2 May 2018, netting the opener in the 23rd minute in the 2018 Chinese FA Cup against Guizhou Hengfeng which Guangzhou eventually lost in the penalty shoot-out. Often used very sparingly, he would be loaned out to second tier club Beijing BSU on 11 September 2020 and another second tier club, Meizhou Hakka on 9 April 2021.

Career statistics
.

Honours

Club
Guangzhou Evergrande
Chinese Super League: 2019
Chinese FA Super Cup: 2018

References

External links
 

1995 births
Living people
Chinese footballers
Footballers from Wuhan
F.C. Paços de Ferreira players
Gondomar S.C. players
Meizhou Hakka F.C. players
Beijing Guoan F.C. players
Guangzhou F.C. players
Beijing Sport University F.C. players
Association football wingers
Chinese expatriate footballers
Expatriate footballers in Portugal
Chinese expatriate sportspeople in Portugal
Chinese Super League players
China League One players
Footballers at the 2018 Asian Games
Asian Games competitors for China
21st-century Chinese people